All the Colours of the World Are Between Black and White is a 2023 Nigerian romantic drama film written and directed by Babatunde Apalowo in his directorial debut. and starring Tope Tedela, Riyo David and Martha Ehinome Orhiere. The film follows two men named Bambino and Bawa who meet in Lagos during a photography competition and get friendly. Exploring the city they develop a strong affection for each other. But, due to societal norms about homosexuality, they are uncomfortable to express. 

It is nominated to compete for the Panorama Audience Award at the 73rd Berlin International Film Festival, where it had its world premiere on February 17, 2023. Babatunde Apalowo, the first feature director is also nominated for GWFF Best First Feature Award in the festival. The film was the winner of the Teddy Award for best LGBTQ-themed feature film at Berlin.

Cast

 Tope Tedela as Bambino
 Riyo David as Bawa
 Martha Ehinome Orhiere as Ifeyinwa
 Uchechika Elumelu as Mama
 Floyd Anekwe as Boss

Production

The film is written and directed by Babatunde Apalowo in his directorial debut. Tope Tedela and Riyo David as main lead, and Martha Ehinome Orhiere, Uche Chika Elumelu and Floyd Anekwe were cast to play supporting roles. In a statement on the themes and relevance, Apalowo stated, "The main theme of the film is love, as it is a love story between two people, despite their sexual identities. The film is a reflection on love, identity, acceptance, and the complexities of navigating life as an outsider in a society that often rejects those who are different." The film is produced by Damilola Orimogunje.

Release

All the Colours of the World Are Between Black and White had its premiere on 17 February 2023 as part of the 73rd Berlin International Film Festival, in Panorama.

It was reported on 14 February 2023 that Italy-based Coccinelle Film Sales has acquired world rights of the film.

Reception

Lida Bach of movie break rated the film 6.5 stars out of 10, praised the performances and direction writing, "With formal reduction and convincing performers, Babatunde Apalowo makes the inner struggle tangible". Talking about the setting, which, as per her, is similar to the characters split between modernism and reactionism, Bach opined that "their character development anchors a story between a plea for tolerance and a psychological parable that overcomes their minimal resources.

Accolades

References

External links
 
 
 All the Colours of the World Are Between Black and White at Berlinale

2023 films
2023 LGBT-related films
Nigerian LGBT-related films
LGBT-related drama films
2020s English-language films
English-language Nigerian films
Nigerian drama films
2023 drama films
2023 directorial debut films
Films set in Lagos